This is a list of Royal Societies listed alphabetically with the date of founding:

UK and Ireland

Royal Academy, founded 1768
Royal Aeronautical Society 1866
Royal African Society 1968
Royal Anthropological Institute 1871
Royal Archaeological Institute 1844
Royal Asiatic Society 1823
Royal Astronomical Society 1820
Royal Bath and West of England Society 1777
Royal Birmingham Society of Artists 1868
Royal British Society of Sculptors 1904
Royal Cornwall Polytechnic Society 1832
Royal Dublin Society 1731
Royal Economic Society 1902
Royal Entomological Society 1833
Royal Geographical Society 1830
Royal Geological Society of Cornwall 1814
Royal Geological Society of Ireland 1831 – 1934
Royal Historical Society 1868
Royal Horticultural Society 1804 and 1861
Royal Horticultural Society of Ireland 1816
Royal Institute of British Architects 1834
Royal Institution of Chartered Surveyors 1881
Royal Institution of Naval Architects 1860
Royal Irish Academy 1785
Royal Medical Society 1773
Royal Meteorological Society 1850
Royal Microscopical Society 1839
Royal Numismatic Society 1836
Royal Pharmaceutical Society of Great Britain 1841 and 1988
Royal Philosophical Society of Glasgow 1802
Royal Philatelic Society London 1869
Royal Photographic Society 1853
Royal Scottish Academy 1826
Royal Scottish Geographical Society 1884
Royal Society 1660
Royal Society for Asian Affairs 1901
Royal Society for the Prevention of Accidents 1917
Royal Society for the Prevention of Cruelty to Animals 1840
Royal Society for the Promotion of Health 1904
Royal Society for the Protection of Birds 1904
Royal Society of Antiquaries of Ireland 1849
Royal Society of Arts 1754
Royal Society of Biology 2015
Royal Society of British Artists 1823
Royal Society of Chemistry 1980
Royal Society of Edinburgh 1783
Royal Society of St George 1894
Royal Society of Literature 1820
Royal Society of Marine Artists 1939
Royal Society of Medicine 1805
Royal Society of Miniature Painters, Sculptors and Gravers 1895
Royal Society of Portrait Painters 1891
Royal Society of Sculptors 1905
Royal Society of Tropical Medicine and Hygiene 1920
Royal Society of Wildlife Trusts 1916 1976 (incl the Royal Society for Nature Conservation)
Royal Statistical Society 1834
Royal West of England Academy 1913

Commonwealth
Australia

Royal Society of New South Wales 1821
Royal Society of Tasmania 1844
Royal Society of Victoria 1854
Royal Society of South Australia 1880
Royal Society of Queensland 1884
Royal Geographical Society of Queensland 1885
Royal Historical Society of Victoria 1909
Royal Historical Society of Queensland 1913
Royal Society of Western Australia 1914
Royal Australian Chemical Institute 1917

Canada

Royal Society of Canada 1882
Royal Astronomical Society of Canada 1890
Royal Canadian Geographical Society 1929
Royal Heraldry Society of Canada 1966

New Zealand

Royal Society of New Zealand 1851
Royal Philatelic Society of New Zealand 1888
Royal New Zealand Plunket Society 1907
Royal Astronomical Society of New Zealand 1920
Royal Numismatic Society of New Zealand 1931
Royal New Zealand Society for the Prevention of Cruelty to Animals 1933

South Africa

Royal Society of South Africa 1877

References

Royal Societies
Organizations with royal patronage
Societies